Pyaar Kiya To Darna Kya is a 1998 Indian Hindi-language romantic comedy film. Written and directed by Sohail Khan, the film stars his real-life brothers Salman Khan and Arbaaz Khan alongside Kajol and Dharmendra in pivotal roles. The film is shot in the school Daly College, Indore. The film is the first and only collaboration of Salman Khan and Kajol as a pair, after having previously appeared in Karan Arjun (1995) and later, in Kuch Kuch Hota Hai (1998), both of which had Kajol in a romantic pairing with Shahrukh Khan. It was a commercial success at the box office.

At the 44th Filmfare Awards, Pyaar Kiya To Darna Kya received 7 nominations, including Best Film, Best Director (Sohail), Best Actor (Salman) and Best Supporting Actor (Arbaaz), and won R. D. Burman Award for New Music Talent (Kamaal Khan for "O O Jaane Jaana").

Plot 

Muskaan (Kajol) is an orphan girl living on a farm run by her overly-protective older brother, Vishal (Arbaaz Khan) and their 'Chachu' (Dharmendra). Muskaan's childhood friend, Ujaala (Anjala Zaveri), has been carrying a torch for the brooding Vishal since childhood, but he won't give her the time of day. Later on, Muskaan decides she wants to go to a university in Mumbai and has to persuade her brother to let her go. Once in the big city, Suraj (Salman Khan), an underachieving student, who does not get along with his stepmother and is estranged from his father, falls in love with Muskaan. After a few attempts at messing with Muskaan and trying to get her attention, Suraj finally succeeds and Muskaan falls in love with him. One day, when Vishal comes to visit Muskaan, he is mistakenly considered her boyfriend by Suraj and his group of friends. They consequently try to fight Vishal but are instead beaten up. Suraj later learns from Muskaan that Vishal is her brother and he apologizes to Muskaan and Vishal for beating him up. But Vishal does not like Suraj because his terms and conditions of his future brother-in-law are very strenuous physically and he thinks Suraj is neither competent nor a man to be taken seriously. And he decides to bring Muskaan back to the farm sensing Suraj's bad influence on her studies. Suraj pursues her and begins to work on the farm as a stable boy after a chance meeting with 'Chachu' in which he saves Chachu's life. Vishal gives Suraj another chance and puts him to the test; however, he is rejected. Vishal wants Muskaan to marry the brother of Thakur Vijay Singh, not knowing that Thakur Vijay Singh is doing this to merely exact vengeance against the Thakur family for a previous humiliation his own family received. So Suraj must now prevent this from happening and he must also be able to win Vishal's heart if he is really interested in marrying Muskaan. Chachu's half-shocked to know the reason why Suraj came to this village. Eventually, Suraj's friends told Suraj's family about this village. Suraj's family comes. Suraj's stepmother insults Muskaan, who runs away but she accidentally runs into the Singh family and their henchmen. Suraj, Suraj's father, Vishal and his Chachu arrive and rescue Muskaan. Despite injuries, Suraj's stepmother calls the Police because she now cares about Suraj. Vishal accepts Suraj as his future brother-in-law.

Cast

Music

The music for Pyaar Kiya To Darna Kya was composed by Jatin–Lalit, Himesh Reshammiya, and Sajid–Wajid. It was released by T-Series. The lyrics for all tracks by Jatin–Lalit were written by Sameer, the lyrics for Himesh Reshammiya's tracks were written by Sudhakar Sharma, and the lyrics for Sajid–Wajid's track was written by Iqbal Sabri. The soundtrack, especially the song "O O Jaane Jaana", became highly popular, and was one of the highest-selling albums of 1998. In Pagalpanti, the song "Tum Par Hum Hai" renames "Tum Par Hum Hai Atke" which is sung by Mika Singh, Neha Kakkar.

Awards

References

External links
 

1998 films
Films scored by Himesh Reshammiya
Films scored by Sajid–Wajid
Films scored by Jatin–Lalit
1990s Hindi-language films
Indian romantic drama films